The Lafayette Stakes was an American Thoroughbred horse race run annually at Keeneland Race Course in Lexington, Kentucky. Open to three-year-old horses, it is contested on Polytrack synthetic dirt over a distance of seven furlongs.  There is a Lafayette Stakes horse race for three year olds run at six furlongs at in on Evangeline Downs dirt Race Track.

A Listed race from 1983 through 1989, it was elevated to a Grade III event  in 1990 then modified to a non-graded status for 2006.

Since inception, the Lafayette Stakes has been raced at a variety of distances:
 40 feet less than 4 furlongs : 1937-1942, 1946-1953
  furlongs : 1943-1944, 1965-1981
 4 furlongs, 152 feet : 1954-1964
 6 furlongs : 1982-1985, 2005-2006
 7 furlongs : 1986-2004, 2007 to present

The Lafayette Stakes was run in two divisions in 1951, 1952, 1958, 1959, 1960, and 1968.

Due to wartime restrictions, the race was hosted by Churchill Downs in 1943 and 1944. There was no race run in 1945.

Two horses set new Keeneland course records in winning this race: Mals Boy in 1950 and Loom in 1964.

Records
Speed record: (at current distance of 7 furlongs)
 1:21.05 - Carnack's Choice (2007) on Polytrack
 1:21.20 - Cherokee Run (1993) (on dirt)

Most wins by a jockey
 4 - Pat Day (1988, 1992, 1993, 2002)

Most wins by a trainer
 4 - Anthony L. Basile (1967, 1971, 1979, 1983)

Most wins by an owner
 5 - Bwamazon Farm (1967, 1971, 1977, 1979, 1983)
 3 - Claiborne Farm (1956, 1958, 1988)
 3 - William H. Veeneman (1946, 1947, 1952)

Winners

Run in two divisions in 1952.
* † In 1977, Forever Casting won the race but was disqualified from first and set back to last.

References
 The 2008 Lafayette Stakes at Thoroughbred Times

Ungraded stakes races in the United States
Flat horse races for three-year-olds
Recurring sporting events established in 1937
Keeneland horse races
1937 establishments in Kentucky